The Srisailam Dam is constructed across the Krishna River in Nagarkurnool district, Telangana and Nandyal district, Andhra Pradesh near Srisailam temple town and is the 2nd largest capacity working hydroelectric station in India.

Project has an estimated live capacity to hold 178.74 Tmcft at its full reservoir level of  MSL. It's gross storage capacity is 6.116 cubic kms (216 tmc ft). The minimum draw down level (MDDL) of the reservoir is at  MSL from its river sluice gates and corresponding dead storage is 3.42 Tmcft. The left bank underground power station houses  reversible Francis-pump turbines for pumped-storage operation (each Turbine can pump 200 cumecs) and the right bank semi under ground power station houses  Francis-turbine generators.

Tail pond dam/weir located 14 km downstream of Srisailam dam is under advanced stage of construction to hold the water released by the hydro turbines and later pump back into the Srisailam reservoir by operating the turbines in pump mode. The weir portion got breached in November 2015 unable to withstand the normal water release from the hydro power stations. Tail pond weir was completed during the year 2017 and pumping mode operation is being done even when the downstream Nagarjuna Sagar reservoir water level is below  MSL. The tail pond has nearly 1 tmcft live storage capacity.

History 
The Srisailam project began in 1960, Initially only as a power project. After several delays, the main dam was finally completed twenty years later in 1980 July 26. The dam is to provide water for an estimated . Under the right bank branch canal  in Kurnool and Kadapa districts will have assured irrigation. The dam has alone cost  together with the installation of four generating sets of  each. The right bank branch canal is estimated to cost  and the initial investment of  has been provided by the World Bank. The projected cost-benefit ratio of the project has been worked out at 1:1.91 at 10% interest on capital outlay.. In 1998 a coffer dam was over topped by flooding. The power house required repairs and did not generate power for a year. On 2 October 2009, Srisailam dam experienced a record inflow which threatened the dam.

Irrigation
Srisailam right main canal (SRMC) is constructed with 44,000 cusecs capacity at Srisailam reservoir level of  MSL to feed Veligodu reservoir (16.95 tmcft), Brahmamsagar Reservoir (17.74 tmcft), Alaganoor reservoir (2.97 tmcft), Gorakallu reservoir (12.44 tmcft), Owk reservoir (4.15 tmcft), Gandikota Reservoir (26.86 tmcft), Mylavaram reservoir (9.98 tmcft), Somasila reservoir (78 tmcft) and Kandeleru reservoir (68 tmcft) with nearly 235 Tmcft total storage capacity. This canal also supplies water to Telugu Ganga project which supplies Krishna river water to Chennai city for its drinking purpose. This main canal by feeding water to K. C. Canal, Srisailam right bank canal, Telugu Ganga canal and Galeru Nagari canal irrigates vast area in Kurnool, Kadapa, Chittoor and Nellore districts.

Handri-Neeva lift canal by drawing water from the Srisailam reservoir, supplies drinking water in all the districts of Rayalaseema.Veligonda reservoir receives water by gravity through tunnels to irrigate lands in Nellore, Kadapa and Prakasam districts. Kalwakurthy lift irrigation scheme by drawing water from the Srisailam reservoir, supplies irrigation water in Mahbubnagar and Nalgonda districts

Srisailam left bank canal will receive water by gravity through tunnels to irrigate lands in Nalgonda district. Tunnel work is not complete and the required water has been provided to most of the project area by lifting water from the downstream Nagarjuna Sagar reservoir.

Dam Maintenance and Safety 
Systematic Neglect and absence of diversion of funds is evident in maintenance of the dam and lack of any modernization attempts of the Powerhouse. The officers report a shortage of maintenance staff.

Safety concerns to the 2nd largest Hydroelectric project in the country have been raised over the years and have been assessed false subsequently. In 2009, the dam, designed for a maximum flood of 19 lakh cusecs, endured a flood of 25.5 lakh cusecs. According to a survey conducted in summer of 2018, the scouring resulted in the formation of a huge pit in the apron downstream the dam. And a structure protecting the ‘toe’ and foundation of the main dam has weakened. Efforts are not yet made to repair and maintain the dam.

Power generation optimization

At present, the initial inflows into Srisailam reservoir are stored excessively without being used for power generation. The flood water fills the remaining empty Srisailam reservoir quickly and most of the flood water overflows into the downstream Nagarjunasagar reservoir without being used for power generation. The endeavor shall be to fill the Nagarjuna Sagar reservoir fully with the uniform water released through the power generating units.

The existing right bank power station (770 MW) can be converted into pumped storage hydroelectric power (PSHP) to operate in pumping mode when the downstream Nagarjuna Sagar reservoir level is above  MSL. The PSHP can be used for energy storage purposes on daily basis and to transfer Godavari water to the Srisailam reservoir during drought years. Alternately, the tunnel of the existing power station can be used for a new PSHP station to pump water from the Nagarjuna Sagar reservoir to the Srisailam reservoir.

Pumped storage hydro power potential
Srisailam reservoir, serving as lower level reservoir, has potential to install nearly 77,000 MW high head pumped storage hydroelectric plants on its right side.

See also

 Krishna Water Disputes Tribunal
 List of power stations in India
 List of dams and reservoirs in India
 List of hydroelectric power station failures
 Nagarjuna Sagar tail pond

References

Dams completed in 1981
Energy infrastructure completed in 1981
Dams in Andhra Pradesh
Hydroelectric power stations in Andhra Pradesh
Pumped-storage hydroelectric power stations in India
Dams on the Krishna River
Reservoirs in Andhra Pradesh
Buildings and structures in Kurnool district
Geography of Kurnool district
1981 establishments in Andhra Pradesh
20th-century architecture in India